Christos Xenofontos (born January 6, 1989) is a Cypriot former professional soccer player, who played as a striker and midfielder for AEK Larnaca, Othellos Athienou FC, and the Cyprus national football team.

Biography 
Xenofontos was born in Larnaca, Cyprus, on 6 January 1989. He did Karate and played basketball and a child, and started playing soccer at the age of nine. Xenofontos obtained his BSc in sport and exercise science from the UCLan Cyprus.

Career 
At 15, Xenofontos was his team's first scorer at the U-17 Championship with 33 goals. He was called to division 1 at the age of 16, and was first scorer in the friendly games with 6 goals. Xenofontos started his professional soccer career in 2005 with AEK Larnaca, and remained with the team until 2010. He was on loan with Othellos Athienou FC in 2010. Xenofontos played with the Cyprus U15, U17, U19, and U21 national football teams. He returned to playing with AEK Larnaca, but he was marred by a series of metartarsal injuries. He announced his retirement from soccer at the age of 23. Xenofontos founded the Larnaca-based XTC Fitness in 2016, offering sport scientist-supervised individualized coaching. Among his patrons are national team and international athletes, such as basketball players Alex Antetokounmpo, Nikolaos Stylianou, and Cyprus national football team players Ioannis Kosti, Marios Elia, Nikolas Panayiotou, Andreas Avraam, Nestoras Mytidis, Rafail Mamas, Kyriacos Pavlou, Stavros Tsoukalas, Ioakim Toumpas, among others.

References

External links
 
 

1989 births
Living people
AEK Larnaca FC players
Cypriot footballers
Association football forwards